The 2007 Calder Cup Playoffs of the American Hockey League began on April 18, 2007. The sixteen teams that qualified, eight from each conference, played best-of-7 series for division semifinals, finals and conference finals.  The conference champions played a best-of-7 series for the Calder Cup. The Calder Cup Final ended on June 7, 2007 with the Hamilton Bulldogs defeating the Hershey Bears four games to one to win the first Calder Cup in team history. This was a rematch of the 1997 Calder Cup Final, where Hershey defeated Hamilton in five games.

Carey Price won the Jack A. Butterfield Trophy as playoff MVP, and became only the third teenage goaltender to lead his team to a Calder Cup championship in AHL history.

Playoff seeds
After the 2006–07 AHL regular season, 16 teams qualified for the playoffs. The top four teams from each division qualified for the playoffs. However, it was possible for the fifth-placed team in the West Division to take the spot of the fourth-placed team in the North Division if they earned more points, since the North Division had one fewer team. This did not occur as the Grand Rapids Griffins, the fourth-placed team in the North Division finished with 85 points while the Peoria Rivermen, the fifth-placed team in the West Division, finished with 84 points. The Hershey Bears were the Eastern Conference regular season champions as well as the Macgregor Kilpatrick Trophy winners with the best overall regular season record. The Omaha Ak-Sar-Ben Knights were the Western Conference regular season champions.

Eastern Conference

Atlantic Division
Manchester Monarchs – 110 points
Hartford Wolf Pack – 98 points
Providence Bruins – 94 points
Worcester Sharks – 93 points

East Division
Hershey Bears – Eastern Conference regular season champions; Macgregor Kilpatrick Trophy winners, 114 points
Wilkes-Barre/Scranton Penguins – 108 points
Norfolk Admirals – 108 points
Albany River Rats – 81 points

Western Conference

North Division
Manitoba Moose – 102 points
Rochester Americans – 98 points
Hamilton Bulldogs – 95 points
Grand Rapids Griffins – 85 points

West Division
Omaha Ak-Sar-Ben Knights – Western Conference regular season champions, 104 points
Chicago Wolves – 101 points
Milwaukee Admirals – 96 points
Iowa Stars – 88 points

Bracket

In each round the higher seed receives home ice advantage, meaning they can play a maximum of four home games if the series reaches seven games. There is no set series format for each series due to arena scheduling conflicts and travel considerations.

Division Semifinals
Note 1: All times are in Eastern Time (UTC−4).
Note 2: Game times in italics signify games to be played only if necessary.
Note 3: Home team is listed first.

Eastern Conference

Atlantic Division

(A1) Manchester Monarchs vs. (A4) Worcester Sharks

(A2) Hartford Wolf Pack vs. (A3) Providence Bruins

East Division

(E1) Hershey Bears vs. (E4) Albany River Rats

(E2) Wilkes-Barre/Scranton Penguins vs. (E3) Norfolk Admirals

Western Conference

North Division

(N1) Manitoba Moose vs. (N4) Grand Rapids Griffins

(N2) Rochester Americans vs. (N3) Hamilton Bulldogs

West Division

(W1) Omaha Ak-Sar-Ben Knights vs. (W4) Iowa Stars

(W2) Chicago Wolves vs. (W3) Milwaukee Admirals

Division Finals

Eastern Conference

Atlantic Division

(A1) Manchester Monarchs vs. (A3) Providence Bruins

East Division

(E1) Hershey Bears vs. (E2) Wilkes-Barre/Scranton Penguins

Western Conference

North Division

(N1) Manitoba Moose vs. (N3) Hamilton Bulldogs

West Division

(W2) Chicago Wolves vs. (W4) Iowa Stars

Conference finals

Eastern Conference

(E1) Hershey Bears vs. (A1) Manchester Monarchs

Western Conference

(W2) Chicago Wolves vs. (N3) Hamilton Bulldogs

Calder Cup Final

(E1) Hershey Bears vs. (N3) Hamilton Bulldogs

See also
2006–07 AHL season
List of AHL seasons

References

Calder Cup playoffs
Calder Cup